The 1962 Florida State Seminoles baseball team represented Florida State University in the 1962 NCAA University Division baseball season. The Seminoles played their home games at Seminole Field. The team was coached by Danny Litwhiler in his eighth season at Florida State.

The Seminoles reached the College World Series, their second appearance in Omaha, where they finished in fourth place after recording an opening round win against Santa Clara and a second-round game against Ithaca, then losing against eventual champion Michigan and a semifinal match up against runner-up Santa Clara.

Personnel

Roster

Coaches

Schedule and results

References

Florida State Seminoles baseball seasons
Florida State Seminoles
College World Series seasons
Florida State Seminoles baseball